William Walker  was Dean of Aberdeen and Orkney from 1896  to 1906.

He was born into a farming family in the Garioch and educated at Aberdeen Grammar School and the city's university. After a curacy at St Andrew,  Aberdeen he was Rector of Monymusk from 1844 to 1900. He died on 11 March 1911.

Notes

Year of birth missing
1911 deaths
People from Aberdeenshire
People educated at Aberdeen Grammar School
Alumni of the University of Aberdeen
Deans of Aberdeen and Orkney